Gloria Cheng is an American pianist who won a Grammy Award for her 2008 Piano Music of Esa-Pekka Salonen, Steven Stucky, and Witold Lutosławski, and a nomination for The Edge of Light: Messiaen/Saariaho. Her film, "Montage: Great Film Composers and the Piano" (2016), documenting the recording of the eponymous CD (harmonia mundi usa) of works composed for her by Bruce Broughton, Don Davis, Alexandre Desplat, Michael Giacchino, Randy Newman, and John Williams, aired on PBS SoCal and was awarded the 2018 Los Angeles Area Emmy for Independent Programming. 
She is on the faculty at UCLA.  She served as 2012 Regents Lecturer at the University of California, Berkeley.

Education
She holds a B.A. in Economics from Stanford University, and graduate degrees in Music from the University of California, Los Angeles (UCLA) and the University of Southern California (USC). She also studied piano in Paris and Barcelona, her primary teachers were Isabelle Sant'Ambrogio, Aube Tzerko, and John Perry.

Career
Gloria Cheng is widely recognized as an eloquent performer of contemporary music. The Washington post has called her “one of the most adventurous interpreters of contemporary music around."
She has been played at the Ojai Festival, Chicago Humanities Festival, William Kapell Festival, the Mendocino Music Festival, and Tanglewood Festival of Contemporary Music, and has commissioned, premiered, and been the dedicatee of countless works by an international roster of composers. 
Cheng has been a soloist with the Los Angeles Philharmonic under Zubin Mehta and Pierre Boulez, and on its Green Umbrella series under Esa-Pekka Salonen and Oliver Knussen.

References

External links
 Official website

Year of birth missing (living people)
Living people
American classical pianists
American women classical pianists
Stanford University alumni
University of California, Los Angeles alumni
University of Southern California alumni
21st-century classical pianists
21st-century American women pianists
21st-century American pianists
UCLA Herb Alpert School of Music faculty